Cheriya Konni(ചെറിയ കൊണ്ണി) is a small village in the suburbs of the Thiruvananthapuram City in Kerala, India. It is located 14 km from the Kerala Legislative Assembly and 15 km from the Kerala Government Secretariat. The Karamana River, which starts near the southern tip of the Western Ghats at Agastyar Koddam and flows 66 km westward, flows through the village. Cheriyakonni has been included in the proposed alignment of the Trivandrum outer ring road project. Major educational institutions such as the College of Architecture (CAT), the GV Raja Sports School and IMDR College of Advanced Studies (I-CAS) are situated near the area.

Constituencies
Taluk – Nedumangadu
Village – Aruvikkara
Block – Nedumangadu
Legislative Constituency – Aruvikkara(MLA Sri.G.Steephan)
Parliament Constituency  – MP Adoor Prakash (Attingal)
Post Office Cheriya Konni
PIN 695 013

References

IMDR College of Advanced Studies (I-CAS)

Villages in Thiruvananthapuram district